The 2002 Little League World Series took place between August 16 and August 25 in South Williamsport, Pennsylvania. The Valley Sports American Little League of Pleasure Ridge Park, a suburb of Louisville, Kentucky, defeated Sendai Higashi Little League of Sendai, Japan, in the championship game of the 56th Little League World Series.

Notable players included 2011 NASCAR Camping World Truck Series and 2013 NASCAR Nationwide Series champion Austin Dillon, a member of the Clemmons, North Carolina, Little League representing the Southeast region.

Qualification

Between five and twelve teams take part in 16 regional qualification tournaments, which vary in format depending on region. In the United States, the qualification tournaments are in the same format as the Little League World Series itself: a round-robin tournament followed by an elimination round to determine the regional champion.

Pool play
The top two teams in each pool move on to their respective semifinals. The winners of each met on August 25 to play for the Little League world championship.

August 16

August 17

August 18

August 19

August 20

International

August 16

August 17

August 18

August 19

August 20

Elimination rounds

Notes 
 † Game ended by "mercy rule" (at least a 10-run difference through 5 innings)

Champions path
The Louisville Valley Sports American LL went undefeated on their road to the LLWS, winning all eleven of their matches. In total record was 17-0.

References

External links 
2002 official results via Wayback Machine
Recap of championship game via Wayback Machine

Little League World Series
Little League World Series
Little League World Series
Sports in Louisville, Kentucky